Mark Smartt is an American baseball coach. He played at DeKalb Central Junior College and Troy State, where he earned All-Conference honors and helped the team to two NCAA Division II College World Series championships. He served as a graduate assistant for the Troy State Trojans before becoming an assistant at the University of West Alabama. He was promoted to the head coach of West Alabama in 1994. He served as an assistant coach at Troy State for thirteen years before ascending to the top job. On June 28, 2021, Smartt and Troy mutually agreed to part ways.

Head coaching record

References

External links
Mark Smartt, Head Baseball Coach - Troy University

Living people
Junior college baseball players in the United States
Troy Trojans baseball players
Troy Trojans baseball coaches
West Alabama Tigers baseball coaches
Year of birth missing (living people)